Chairman of Committees may refer to:
 Chairman of Committees (Australian House of Representatives), former title of the Deputy Speaker of the Australian House of Representatives
 Chairman of Committees (Australian Senate), one of the roles of the Deputy President of the Senate
 Chairman of Committees (House of Lords), a role that exists in the British House of Lords
 Chairman of Committees (New Zealand House of Representatives), a role that existed in New Zealand between 1854 and 1992
 Chairman of Committees (New Zealand Legislative Council), a role that existed in New Zealand between 1865 and 1950